KHLS is a radio station airing a country music format licensed to Blytheville, Arkansas, broadcasting on 96.3 MHz FM.  The station serves the areas of Blytheville, Arkansas, Dyersburg, Tennessee, Covington, Tennessee, and Kennett, Missouri, and is owned by Sudbury Services, Inc.

The home of Blytheville Chickasaw Football. The home of Arkansas Razorbacks Football.

References

External links
KHLS official website

January 1979 aircheck

Country radio stations in the United States
HLS